Donemana railway station served Donemana, County Tyrone in Northern Ireland.

It was opened by the Donegal Railway Company on 6 August 1900. 
It closed on 1 January 1955.

Accident

The station was the site of a fatal accident after 9 p.m. on Sunday 7 September 1913, when an approaching train from Derry failed to slow down and stop. One person was killed and several injured, some seriously. One of the small group of passengers travelling from Derry, Margaret McCay, wife of farmer John McCay, from the townland of Gortileck between the villages of Dunamanagh and Artigarvan, was five months pregnant and suffered a mild concussion in the accident. She and the unborn child survived, with the safe arrival of John McCay on 4 January 1914. The Board of Trade enquiry found 'excessive speed' and an 'intoxicated driver and fireman' to be the cause of the accident.

Routes

References

Disused railway stations in County Tyrone
Railway stations opened in 1900
Railway stations closed in 1955
Railway stations in Northern Ireland opened in the 20th century